Pthilothamnus thomensis (São Tomé wood snake) is a species of snakes of the family Colubridae. It is endemic to the island of São Tomé in São Tomé and Príncipe. The species was described in 1882 by José Vicente Barbosa du Bocage.

References

Further reading

 Bocage, J.V.B. de 1882: Notice sur les espèces du genre "Philothamnus" qui se trouvent au Muséum de Lisbonne. Jorn. Sc. Lisb. 9  (33): p. 11
 Boulenger, George A. 1894: Catalogue of the Snakes in the British Museum (Natural History). Volume II., Containing the Conclusion of the Colubridæ Aglyphæ. British Mus. (Nat. Hist.), London, xi, p. 101
 Günther, A. 1895: Notice of Reptiles and Batrachians collected in the eastern half of tropical Africa. Ann. Mag. nat. Hist. (6) 15: 528

Colubrids
Endemic fauna of São Tomé Island
Reptiles described in 1882
Taxa named by José Vicente Barbosa du Bocage